William Guest may refer to:

William Guest (rugby union) (1903–1991), English player for Wakefield RFC, later a Territorial Army major
William S. Guest (1913–1992), U.S. Navy rear-admiral
William Guest (singer) (1941–2015), American R&B/soul singer, a member of Gladys Knight & the Pips